Matthew Holden Jr. is an American political scientist.

Biography
He attended public school in Mississippi and Chicago, Illinois. He graduated from the University of Chicago in 1950 and received a B.A. degree in political science from Roosevelt University in 1954.  He received an M.A. from Northwestern University in 1956 and his Ph.D. in 1961. He served in the Korean War from 1955 to 1957.

Holden taught political science at the University of Illinois, Wayne State University,
and the University of Pittsburgh. He was a professor of Political Science/Public Policy Administration at the University of Wisconsin–Madison from 1969 to 1981. He joined the University of Virginia faculty in 1981 and became the Henry L. and Grace M. Doherty Professor Emeritus of Politics.

He served on the Public Service Commission of Wisconsin from 1975 to 1977 and on the Federal Energy Regulatory Commission from 1977 to 1981. Later in 177, Holden was elected as a fellow of the National Academy of Public Administration. He has published numerous articles. He became President of the American Political Science Association in 1989. He retired in 2002.

References

External links
Biography

Year of birth missing (living people)
Living people
African-American people in Wisconsin politics
Federal Power Commission
Roosevelt University alumni
University of Chicago alumni
Northwestern University alumni
Wayne State University faculty
University of Illinois Urbana-Champaign faculty
University of Wisconsin–Madison faculty
University of Pittsburgh faculty
University of Virginia faculty